Clover Valley is an unincorporated community in Duluth Township, Saint Louis County, Minnesota, United States.

The center of Clover Valley is near the intersection of Homestead Road and Hegberg Road. The community is five miles inland from Lake Superior's North Shore on Homestead Road.

The communities of Knife River, Palmers, and French River are nearby.

References

Unincorporated communities in Minnesota
Unincorporated communities in St. Louis County, Minnesota